Frederick L. Stackable (December 4, 1935July 31, 2022) was a former member of the Michigan House of Representatives.

Early life
Stackable was born on December 4, 1935.

Education
Stackable earned a Bachelors of Science degree from Michigan State University and a Juris Doctor degree from Wayne State University.

Career
Stackable was a lawyer. On November 3, 1970, Stackable was elected to the Michigan House of Representatives where he represented the 58th district from January 1, 1971 to 1974.

Personal life
Stackable married Joyce Howard Frank on July 30, 1999.

Stackable died on July 31, 2022.

References

1935 births
2022 deaths
Michigan lawyers
Wayne State University alumni
Michigan State University alumni
Republican Party members of the Michigan House of Representatives
20th-century American politicians
20th-century American lawyers